Beniaminów  is a village in Poland. It has approximately 190 inhabitants (1998) and is located in the Masovian Voivodship, east of Warsaw, between Legionowo and Nieporęt.

Within the village are remnants of a 19th-century fort.

In 1917, after the Oath Crisis, members of the Polish Legions who had refused to swear an oath of loyalty to the German Kaiser were interned there.

During World War II, between 1941 and 1944, the German Wehrmacht ran a prisoner-of-war camp (Stalag 333) there for Soviet soldiers. More than 30,000 of them died from harsh treatment and malnutrition.

Villages in Legionowo County